Michael Sanchez may refer to: 

Michael S. Sanchez (born 1950), American attorney and politician
Michael Sánchez (born 1986), Cuban volleyball player
Michael Sanchez (singer), participant in the 11th season of the American reality show The Voice

See also
Miguel Sanchez (disambiguation)
Mike Sanchez (Jesus Miguel "Mike" Sanchez, born 1964), British musician